James Xie Shiguang (May 7, 1917 – August 25, 2005) was a bishop of People's Republic of China's Underground Roman Catholic Church.

Career 
Xie was ordained to the priesthood on May 3, 1949, and he became a bishop on January 25, 1984.

Arrests 
Xie was arrested multiple times in China. The first arrest was in 1955, when he refused to enter the Chinese Patriotic Catholic Association. He was arrested again for the same reason in 1958, but he was sentenced to 15 years imprisonment. He was then arrested in 1984, released in 1987, and was arrested yet again in 1990 until he was once again released in 1992. 

In 1999, Xie was invited by Chinese government officials "for a chat" that lasted for two months. The location of the meeting is unknown. After the meeting, he was freed but was under surveillance for the rest of his life.

Death 
Xie died from leukemia on August 25, 2005 at the age of 88.

Legacy 
A street has been named after him in 2021 in Budapest.

See also

Catholicism in China

References 

20th-century Roman Catholic bishops in China
1917 births
2005 deaths
21st-century Roman Catholic bishops in China
Deaths from leukemia